The 2018–19 Senior Women's National Football Championship is the 24th edition of the Senior Women's National Football Championship, the premier competition in India for women's teams representing regional and state football associations.

Tamil Nadu are currently the defending champions, having defeated Manipur in the final during the 2017–18 edition of the tournament. The tournament is being hosted in Odisha and is running from 18 September to 1 October 2018 at the Barabati Stadium.

Manipur won the championship beating Odisha 2–1 in the final.

Format
The 27 teams in the tournament are split into 8 groups of 3–4 teams each. On  27 September, there will be four quarter-final matches and on 29 September there will be two semi-final matches. The Final itself will occur on 1 October.

Round dates
The schedule will be follows.

Group stage

Group A

References

External links
 Senior Women's National Football Championship on the All India Football Federation website

Senior Women's National Football Championship
2018–19 in Indian football